The 1980 Minnesota Golden Gophers football team was an American football team that represented the University of Minnesota in the 1980 Big Ten Conference football season. In their second year under head coach Joe Salem, the Golden Gophers finished in fifth place in the Big Ten Conference (Big Ten), compiled a 5–6 record (4–5 against Big Ten opponents), and were outscored by their opponents by a combined total of 250 to 210.

The team's statistical leader included quarterback Tim Salem (son of head coach Joe Salem) with 887 passing yards, fullback Garry White with 959 rushing yards, Chester Cooper with 210 receiving yards, and tailback Marion Barber Jr. with 66 points scored. Several Minnesota players also ranked among the Big Ten leaders in various statistical categories, including the following:
 Marion Barber led the Big Ten with 11 rushing touchdowns and ranked seventh with 769 rushing yards. 
 Garry White ranked second in the Big Ten with 5.4 yards per rushing attempt, third with nine rushing touchdowns and 1,136 yards from scrimmage, and fourth with 959 rushing yards.
 Tim Salem ranked fifth in the Big Ten with 13 interceptions, eighth with a 47.6 pass completion percentage and ninth with 887 passing yards and an 80.1 passer efficiency rating.
 
Marion Barber was the team captain and received the team's Most Valuable Player award. Barber, fullback Garry White, and defensive end Jeff Schuh were named All-Big Ten first team.  Offensive guard Ken Dallafoir, free safety Mike Robb, linebacker Jeff Schuh, and defensive tackle Dana Noel were named All-Big Ten second team. Defensive lineman Brent Harms, defensive lineman Fred Orgas and free safety Mike Robb were named Academic All-Big Ten.

Total attendance for the season was 265,105, which averaged to 44,184. The season high for attendance was against rival Iowa.

Schedule

Roster

Game summaries

Ohio
On September 13, Minnesota defeated the Ohio Bobcats, 38–14, at Memorial Stadium in Minneapolis.  Freshman quarterback Tim Salem, the son of Minnesota head coach Joe Salem, passed for 162 yards in his college debut. Marion Barber, Jr. also rushed for 127 yards, and Garry White scored three touchdowns to lead the Golden Gophers.

at Ohio State
On September 20, in its first game against a Big Ten opponent, Minnesota lost to Ohio State (AP No. 2), 47–0, before the largest crowd (87,916) in Ohio Stadium history. Ohio State led, 33–0, at halftime in the one-sided contest. Minnesota running back Garry White fumbled twice, and quarterback Tim Salem threw three interceptions to help the Buckeyes' cause.

USC
On September 27, Minnesota lost to USC (AP No. 5), 24–7, in Minneapolis. The game drew a crowd of 55,115, the largest to attend a Minnesota football game in seven years. 1981 Heisman Trophy winner Marcus Allen rushed for 216 yards on 42 carries and scored two touchdowns for USC.

at Northwestern
On October 4, the week's only conference game matched Minnesota against Northwestern at Dyche Stadium (Evanston, Illinois).  Minnesota won, 49–21, led by running backs Marion Barber, Jr. (118 rushing yards, three touchdowns) and Garry White (129 rushing yards, two touchdowns).

at Purdue
On October 11, Purdue defeated Minnesota, 21–7, in West Lafayette. In the first half, Purdue took a 21-0 lead, as Mark Herrmann completed 14 of 19 passes for 163 yards and two touchdowns. Purdue was shut out in the second half, and Herrmann had only 28 passing yards in the second half, but Purdue's 21 points in the first half were enough for the victory.

Michigan

    
    
    
    
    
    
    
    
    

On October 18, Minnesota lost to Michigan, 37–14, on homecoming day at Memorial Stadium in Minneapolis. The crowd of 56,297 was the largest at Memorial Stadium since 1973. Minnesota crowded the line of scrimmage to stop Michigan's run game, opening up the passing game. Michigan quarterback John Wangler completed 16 of 22 passes for 227 yards.

In the first quarter, Michigan drove 80 yards on 11 plays, ending with a 27-yard touchdown run by Butch Woolfolk. The Golden Gophers tied the game early in the second quarter on a one-yard run by Marion Barber. Ali Haji-Sheikh put Michigan back in the lead with a 45-yard field goal.

With less than five minutes remaining in the first half, Wangler threw an interception at Minnesota's 15-yard line. Two plays later, Barber fumbled, and Michigan recovered at the five-yard line.  Woolfolk followed with his second touchdown on a one-yard run. 

After a defensive hold, Haji-Sheikh kicked his second field goal with 25 seconds remaining in the half. Minnesota fumbled again on its next play from scrimmage, and Michigan recovered at the eight-yard line. Haji-Sheikh kicked his third field goal of the quarter. Michigan scored 13 points in the last three-and-a-half minutes of the half, including two field goals in the last 30 seconds, to take a 23–7 lead at halftime. After the game, Minnesota coach Joe Salem said: "It was unbelievable. Everything in the world that you could imagine going wrong happened to us in those last few minutes of the second quarter. The roof caved in."

In the second half, Wangler threw two touchdown passes to Anthony Carter -- a 27-yarder in the third quarter and a five-yarder in the fourth quarter. Carter, who faced man-to man-coverage for much of the game, caught nine passes for 142 yards in the game. After the game, coach Schembechler boasted that "Anthony Carter is the best receiver I've ever had. He's dynamite." Carter added, "my eyes kind of light up when I see man-to-man coverage."

Minnesota scored a fourth-quarter touchdown after Rich Hewlett turned the ball over on a fumble at Michigan's 20-yard line. Barber scored on a one-yard run.

Iowa
On October 25, in the annual battle for the Floyd of Rosedale trophy, Minnesota defeated Iowa, 24–6, before a crowd of 58,158 in Minneapolis. Iowa fumbled eight times, gave up eight sacks, and managed to score only two field goals. Marion Barber, Jr. scored three rushing touchdowns for Minnesota.

at Illinois
On November 1, Minnesota defeated Illinois, 21–18, before a homecoming crowd of 51,202 at Memorial Stadium in Champaign, Illinois. Illinois quarterback Dave Wilson completed 22 of 59 passes for 310 yards and two touchdowns. The game was marred by 12 fumbles and 22 penalties. Minnesota's running backs, Marion Barber, Jr. and Garry White rushed for 162 and 103 yards, respectively.

Indiana
On November 8, Minnesota defeated Indiana, 31–7, in Minneapolis. Indiana quarterback Tim Clifford was knocked out of the game in the first half by "a savage blindside tackle" by Jeff Schuh. Minnesota running back Garry White rushed for 145 yards and two touchdowns.

Michigan State
On November 15, Michigan State defeated Minnesota, 30–12, before a crowd of 30,329 in Minneapolis. Michigan State quarterback John Leister passed for 209 yards and three touchdowns. Minnesota quarterback Tim Salem completed only 5 of 15 passes, threw two interceptions, and fumbled twice.

at Wisconsin

On November 22, in the annual battle for Paul Bunyan' Axe, Wisconsin defeated Minnesota, 25–7, at Camp Randall Stadium in Madison. Wisconsin quarterback, Jess Cole, in his second start, scored four touchdowns. Tim Salem was injured when he was tackled throwing a pass in the second quarter and did not return.

References

Minnesota
Minnesota Golden Gophers football seasons
Minnesota Golden Gophers football